Mercedes is a district of the Montes de Oca canton, in the San José province of Costa Rica.

Geography 
Mercedes has an area of  km² and an elevation of  metres.

Locations
Barrios (neighborhoods): Betania, Alma Máter, Damiana, Dent (part), Guaymí, Paso Hondo, Paulina, Profesores

Demographics 

For the 2011 census, Mercedes had a population of  inhabitants.

Transportation

Road transportation 
The district is covered by the following road routes:
 National Route 39
 National Route 201
 National Route 202

References 

Districts of San José Province
Populated places in San José Province